Rahel Frey (born 23 February 1986 in Niederbipp, Canton of Bern) is a Swiss Audi factory racing driver. She has competed in such series as Eurocup Formula Renault 2.0, International Formula Master and the German Formula Three Championship.

Frey competed in the LMGT1 category of 2010 24 Hours of Le Mans. She shared #61 Matech Competition Ford GT with fellow Swiss female drivers Natacha Gachnang and Cyndie Allemann. All three participating Fords were forced to retire from the race.

Frey then joined the Audi DTM squad and replaced Katherine Legge in 2011. Then decided she did not wish to carry on with her DTM career and left at the start of the 2013 season.

In 2019 she joined the all female Kessell team with Manuela Gostner and Michelle Gatting for the European Le Mans Series. They were the first all-woman team to finish since 1977 and they were 39th and ninth in their class.

Racing record

Career summary

† As Frey was a guest driver, she was ineligible for points.
* Season still in progress.

Complete Eurocup Formula Renault 2.0 results
(key) (Races in bold indicate pole position) (Races in italics indicate fastest lap)

Complete 24 Hours of Le Mans results

Complete Deutsche Tourenwagen Masters results
(key) (Races in bold indicate pole position) (Races in italics indicate fastest lap)

Complete European Le Mans Series results
(key) (Races in bold indicate pole position; results in italics indicate fastest lap)

Complete IMSA SportsCar Championship results
(key) (Races in bold indicate pole position; races in italics indicate fastest lap)

Complete FIA World Endurance Championship results
(key) (Races in bold indicate pole position) (Races in italics indicate fastest lap)

References

External links
 
 

1986 births
Living people
People from Oberaargau District
Swiss racing drivers
German Formula Renault 2.0 drivers
Formula Renault 2.0 Alps drivers
Italian Formula Renault 2.0 drivers
Formula Renault Eurocup drivers
International Formula Master drivers
German Formula Three Championship drivers
A1 Grand Prix Rookie drivers
Deutsche Tourenwagen Masters drivers
FIA GT1 World Championship drivers
Blancpain Endurance Series drivers
ADAC GT Masters drivers
24 Hours of Le Mans drivers
24 Hours of Spa drivers
Audi Sport TT Cup drivers
Swiss female racing drivers
European Le Mans Series drivers
24H Series drivers
24 Hours of Daytona drivers
WeatherTech SportsCar Championship drivers
FIA World Endurance Championship drivers
Sportspeople from the canton of Bern
Phoenix Racing drivers
Nürburgring 24 Hours drivers
Jenzer Motorsport drivers
Van Amersfoort Racing drivers
Jo Zeller Racing drivers
Abt Sportsline drivers
W Racing Team drivers
Audi Sport drivers
Iron Lynx drivers